Chromatin target of PRMT1 is a protein that in humans is encoded by the CHTOP gene.

Function 

This gene encodes a small nuclear protein that is characterized by an arginine and glycine rich region. The encoded protein may be involved in cell cycle progression. This protein interacts with protein arginine methyltransferases and plays a role in the activation of estradiol-dependent transcription. Alternate splicing results in multiple transcript variants.

References

Further reading